Yuan Xi (died December 207), courtesy name Xianyi or Xianyong, was a  Chinese military general, politician, and warlord. He was the second son of Yuan Shao, a warlord who controlled much of northern China during the late Eastern Han dynasty. He was executed along with his brother Yuan Shang by Gongsun Kang.

Yuan Xi's wife, Lady Zhen, was taken as a wife by Cao Cao's son, Cao Pi, while Yuan Xi still lived.

Descendants
Yuan Shuji, a Tang dynasty chancellor, was a descendant of Yuan Xi.

In Romance of the Three Kingdoms
Yuan Xi was described in the 14th-century historical novel Romance of the Three Kingdoms as "intelligent but weak and indecisive", in contrast to his older brother Yuan Tan, who was described as "brave but impulsive and violent". After the combined forces of Yuan Xi and his younger brother Yuan Shang was defeated in battle against Cao Cao in the follow-up battles after the Battle of Guandu, he fled to Liaodong with Yuan Shang and stayed with administrator Gongsun Kang, hoping to one day take over Gongsun's forces and have their revenge on Cao Cao. However, they were themselves betrayed and were killed in an ambush set up by Gongsun, who instead wanted to join Cao's forces.

See also
 Lists of people of the Three Kingdoms

References

 Chen, Shou (3rd century). Records of the Three Kingdoms (Sanguozhi).
 
 Fan, Ye (5th century). Book of the Later Han (Houhanshu).
 Pei, Songzhi (5th century). Annotations to Records of the Three Kingdoms (Sanguozhi zhu).
 Sima, Guang (1084). Zizhi Tongjian.

207 deaths
2nd-century births
3rd-century executions
Executed Han dynasty people
Generals under Yuan Shao
Han dynasty people killed in battle
Han dynasty warlords
Officials under Yuan Shao
People executed by the Han dynasty by decapitation
Political office-holders in Beijing